The Sozialversicherungen (Social Security) in Switzerland includes several public and private insurance plans to assist the welfare of the population.

Constitutional principles
The basic principles of social insurance are found in Articles 111 to 114 and Articles 116 and 117 of the Swiss Federal Constitution.

Article 111 defines the so-called "three-pillar principle", which regulates the structure of retirement, survivors', and disability benefits. Article 112 provides the basis for the old-age, survivors', and disability insurance, in Article 113 that of occupational pensions. Article 114 regulates the basis of the unemployment insurance; provisions for family allowances and maternity insurance are laid down in Article 116. Finally, in Article 117 sickness and accident insurance is regulated by constitutional law.

The old-age and survivors' insurance (Alters- und Hinterlassenenversicherung - AHV), together with the disability insurance (Invalidenversicherung - IV) and supplementary benefits, forms the first (state) pillar of the Swiss three-pillar system and serves to adequately safeguard the need for subsistence.

Financing
Social insurance is mostly financed by direct deductions from individual wages. The contributions are based on an individual's income. They are carried "on a parity basis," half by employers and half by employees. The only exception is health insurance, where income-independent head premiums are paid. In addition, there are also contributions from the public sector, for example old age pensions and disability pensions are financed by 5% from tobacco tax.

Individual types of social security
Social security insurance was introduced in Switzerland in 1948.

Social security services in Switzerland includes:
 Unemployment insurance (German: Arbeitslosenversicherung, ALV; French: Assurance-chômage, AC; Italian: Assicurazione contro la disoccupazione, AD), normally directly deducted from salary if resident is employed
 Income compensations (German: Erwerbsersatzordnung, EO; French: allocations pour perte de gain, APG)
 Family allowances (German: Familienzulagen, French: allocations familiales)
 Disability insurance (German: Invalidenversicherung, IV; French: Assurance-invalidité, AI; Italian: Assicurazione Invalidità, AI) normally directly deducted from salary if resident is employed
 Accident insurance (German: Unfallversicherung, French: assurance-accidents)
 Health insurance (German: Krankenversicherung; Italian: Assicurazione malattia) - compulsory for nearly all residents
 Pension funds
 First pillar: state insurance (German: Alters- und Hinterlassenenversicherung, AHV; French: Assurance-vieillesse et survivants, AVS)
 Second pillar: professional insurance (German: Berufliche Vorsorge, French: prévoyance professionnelle)
 third pillar: personal insurance (German: 3. Säule, French: 3ème pilier)
 Social assistance (German: Sozialhilfe; French: aide sociale; Italian: assistenza sociale)
 Additional services

See also 
 Pension system in Switzerland
 Taxation in Switzerland
 Federal Department of Home Affairs

References

External links 
 Insurances and social security in Switzerland
 Social insurance for foreign nationals
 Social security in Switzerland (Federal Social Insurance Office)
 Social security in Switzerland (brochure)